Lite Roast is the seventeenth studio album by American rock singer Sammy Hagar, and his first acoustic & unplugged album. The album was released on October 14, 2014 by Mailboat Records. It includes acoustically re-recorded versions of Hagar's previously released songs.

Track listing

Personnel
Sammy Hagar - lead vocals, guitar
Vic Johnson - guitar, backing vocals
 Andre Thierry - accordion on tracks 1 & 11

References 

2014 albums
Sammy Hagar albums
Mailboat Records albums